Princess Masna Bolkiah, (born 6 September 1948) is the sister of Sultan Hassanal Bolkiah. Princess Masna Bolkiah is considered the third most important living woman in Brunei Darussalam after Queen Saleha and Crown Princess Sarah.

Early life and education 
She was born at Istana Darussalam, Brunei Town on 6 September 1948, and graduated from Universiti Brunei Darussalam (UBD) with first class honours in BA (Hons) in Public Policy and Administration and a has a Masters in Public Policy also from the UBD. In 1995, she was appointed as the Ambassador-at-Large at the Ministry of Foreign Affairs where she led a number of delegations abroad both as Acting Minister of Foreign Affairs as well as Ambassador-at-large. She is also active in other areas including being the Patron for the Girl Guides Association as well as being Commander of the Women's Police Corps.

Diplomatic career 
Timeline of her career as a diplomat:
1995: Ambassador-at-Large and Second in Command of the Foreign Affairs
1997: Acting Minister of Foreign Affairs
1998: (March–April) Acting Minister of Foreign Affairs
1999: Acting Minister of Foreign Affairs
2000: (November) Acting Minister of Foreign Affairs (Head of the APEC Summit)
2001: Acting Minister of Foreign Affairs (Head of Delegation to ASEM Summit)
2002: (January) Acting Minister of Foreign Affairs
2003: (June) Acting Minister of Foreign Affairs (Head of Delegation to ASEAN Summit)
2004: (June/July) Acting Minister of Foreign Affairs (Head of Delegation to ASEAN Summit)
2010: Ambassador-at-Large at the Ministry of Foreign Affairs and Trade

Personal life

Family 
Princess Masna was first married to Pengiran Muda Abdul Rahman ibni Pengiran Anak Muhammad Hashim in 1965 but would later be divorced in an unknown date. She would be married for the second time with Pengiran Anak Haji Abdul Aziz bin Pengiran Haji Abu Bakar in 1969, of whom she had five children with:
 Pengiran Anak Haji Abdul Wadood Bolkiah
 Pengiran Anak Haji Mohammed Al-Mokhtar
 Pengiran Anak Haji Abdul 'Ali Yil-Kabier
 Pengiran Anak Hajah Ameenah Bushral Bulqiah
 Pengiran Anak Haji Abdul Quddus
On 26 September 2011, Abdul Rahman Hashim passed away at the age of 65, approximately 11am at the RIPAS Hospital and would be buried at the Kubah Makam Di Raja.

Relations 

Her third son, Pengiran Anak Haji Abdul Ali-Yil Kabier Bolkiah is married to his cousin Pengiran Anak Hamidah Jamalul Bolkiah, daughter of Prince Jefri Bolkiah and the wife, Pengiran Anak Isteri Pengiran Norhayati.

He son, YAM Pengiran Anak Haji Abdul Ali-Yil Kabier and YAM Pengiran Anak Hamidah Jamalul Bolkiah and they together of 3 children (1 son and 2 daughters).

 Pengiran Anak Abdul Muta ali Haziq Hamidullah Bolkiah
Pengiran Anak Adriana Haziqah Jaidah Bolkiah
Pengiran Anak Alisha Husnara Jaidah Bolkiah

Honours 

She has been awarded :

National 
  Senior (Laila Utama) of the Family Order of Brunei (DK I, 1970)
  Recipient of the Royal Family Order of the Crown of Brunei (DKMB)
  Pingat Hassanal Bolkiah Sultan (Sultan Hassanal Bolkiah Medal - PHBS, 1 August 1968)
 Sultan of Brunei Golden Jubilee Medal (5 October 2017).

Foreign 
  : Grand Cross of the Order of the White Elephant

Ancestry

References 

Living people
1948 births
Bruneian royalty
Bruneian women diplomats
Women government ministers of Brunei
Bruneian women ambassadors
Daughters of monarchs
Universiti Brunei Darussalam alumni